The fourth season of Dynasty originally aired in the United States on ABC from September 28, 1983, through May 9, 1984. The series, created by Richard and Esther Shapiro and produced by Aaron Spelling, revolves around the Carringtons, a wealthy family residing in Denver, Colorado.

Season four stars John Forsythe as millionaire oil magnate Blake Carrington; Linda Evans as his wife Krystle; Pamela Sue Martin as Blake and Alexis's headstrong daughter Fallon; Jack Coleman as Blake and Alexis's earnest son Steven; Gordon Thomson as Blake and Alexis's eldest son Adam; John James as Fallon's ex-husband Jeff Colby; Pamela Bellwood as Steven's new wife, Claudia; Heather Locklear as Krystle's niece and Steven's ex-wife Sammy Jo; Geoffrey Scott as Krystle's ex-husband Mark Jennings; Lee Bergere as Carrington majordomo Joseph Anders; Kathleen Beller as Joseph's daughter Kirby; Deborah Adair as public relations assistant Tracy Kendall; Michael Nader as businessman Dex Dexter; Helmut Berger as playboy Peter De Vilbis; Diahann Carroll as Blake's half-sister Dominique Deveraux; and Joan Collins as Alexis Colby, Blake's ex-wife and the mother of Adam, Fallon, and Steven.

Development
With the show's popularity soaring in the fourth season (now the third most watched program of 1983–1984), former President Gerald Ford, former First Lady Betty Ford, and former Secretary of State Henry Kissinger guest-starred as themselves in 1983. 

Michael Nader was introduced as Farnsworth "Dex" Dexter, a friend to Blake and a love interest for Alexis. Though Dex was conceived as a supporting, short-term character, Nader's performance made the character "unexpectedly popular". One of the five actors under final consideration for the role, Nader credited his chemistry with Collins with getting him the part. Collins said of Nader, "He's a very romantic leading man and he has a certain sinister edge."

Diahann Carroll was also introduced as wealthy singer and businesswoman Dominique Deveraux, from the beginning intended as a foil for Alexis Colby, the villainess played by Joan Collins. Dominique was revealed to be Blake's half-sister in season five. Noting that the increasingly popular prime time soap operas had yet to tackle racial integration, and wanting to be "the first black bitch on television", Carroll had her manager reach out to Dynasty producer Aaron Spelling, but there had been no response before she and Spelling ran into each other soon after. Spelling said, "When Diahann came in, Esther Shapiro and I looked at her, looked at each other and said, 'My God, she is Dynasty.'" Carroll told Shapiro that night, "If it's not me let it be someone, because it's time." Spelling said, "We virtually closed the deal that night while having a drink at the bar." Joining Dynasty made Carroll the only black actress with a continuing role on a nighttime serial at that time, and Dominique the first prominently-featured African-American character on a prime time soap opera. She appeared in the final two episodes of the fourth season, and was contracted for at least 17 of season five's 29 shows. Willis Edwards, president of the Beverly Hills/Hollywood chapter of the NAACP, said of Carroll's casting, "This is a major thing as far as we're concerned. We've been fighting for something like this for years." Linda Evans, who played Krystle Carrington, said at the time, "I don't think the impact of her coming on the show will affect only blacks. I think it will be great for all the people who see her."

Martin left the series at the end of the fourth season in May 1984. At the time, New York quoted Martin as calling television "limiting". USA Today reported in 2006 that Martin "left Dynasty and acting when she felt her 'glib' character ... had been reduced to 'a victim'." In 2011, she said "I became extremely famous during that time, and it was a little discomforting". Spelling wrote in his 1996 autobiography, "After three seasons, Pamela Sue Martin wanted to leave Dynasty to get married and we didn't stand in her way."

Plot
Steven and Blake battle for custody over Steven and Sammy Jo's son Danny, and a false accusation of illegal weapons dealings orchestrated by Alexis threatens to ruin Blake's financial empire. In the season finale, Fallon disappears just before her second wedding to Jeff, while Alexis is arrested for the murder of Mark Jennings.

Cast

Main

 John Forsythe as Blake Carrington
 Linda Evans as Krystle Carrington
 Pamela Sue Martin as Fallon Carrington
 John James as Jeff Colby 
 Pamela Bellwood as Claudia Blaisdel
 Heather Locklear as Sammy Jo Carrington
Gordon Thomson as Adam Carrington
Kathleen Beller as Kirby Anders
Geoffrey Scott as Mark Jennings
Deborah Adair as Tracy Kendall
Jack Coleman as Steven Carrington
Lee Bergere as Joseph Anders
Helmut Berger as Peter De Vilbis
Michael Nader as Dex Dexter
Diahann Carroll as Dominique Deveraux
 Joan Collins as Alexis Carrington

Recurring

 William Beckley as Gerard
 Virginia Hawkins as Jeanette Robbins
 Peter Mark Richman as Andrew Laird
 Paul Keenan as Tony Driscoll
 Paul Burke as Neal McVane
 Betty Harford as Hilda Gunnerson
 Hank Brandt as Morgan Hess
 Grant Goodeve as Chris Deegan
 John Saxon as Rashid Ahmed
 David Ackroyd as Lt. Merrill

Notable guest stars

 James Sutorious as Gordon Wales

Cast notes

Episodes

Reception
In season four, Dynasty was ranked #3 in the United States with a 22.4 Nielsen rating.

References

External links 
 

1983 American television seasons
1984 American television seasons
Dynasty (1981 TV series) seasons